Douglas Daniel Clark (born March 10, 1948) is an American serial killer. Clark and his accomplice, Carol M. Bundy, were collectively known as the Sunset Strip Killers. They were convicted of multiple murders in Los Angeles, California.

Early life 
Doug Clark was the son of Franklin Clark, a Naval Intelligence officer. His family moved frequently during Clark's childhood due to his father's job, and he later claimed to have lived in 37 countries. In 1958, his father left the Navy for a civilian position as an engineer with the Transport Company of Texas, but the family still moved around.

They lived in the Marshall Islands for a time, moved back to San Francisco, California, and then moved again to India. Clark was sent to an exclusive international school in Geneva and later attended Culver Military Academy while his father continued to move around the world. When he graduated in 1967, Clark enlisted in the U.S. Air Force stationed in Colorado and Ohio.

Clark was eventually discharged from the Air Force, and he drifted around for the next decade, often working as a mechanic. He moved to Los Angeles and was employed as a steam plant operator for the Los Angeles Department of Water and Power, working at the Valley Generating Station before abruptly quitting. Subsequently, Clark became a boiler operator at the Jergens soap factory in Burbank, but was fired due to a high rate of absence and violent threats he had made against his coworkers. One of the bars he frequented in the area was Little Nashville, where he met Carol M. Bundy in 1980. He soon moved in with her and learned they shared dark sexual fantasies.

Murders 
Clark started bringing sex workers back to the couple's apartment to have threesomes. Then, when Clark took an interest in an 11-year-old neighbor, Bundy helped lure the girl into posing for pornographic photographs. Clark quickly escalated from pedophilia, talking about how much he would like to kill a girl during sex. He persuaded Bundy to purchase two pistols for him to use, reportedly seeking to fulfill his fantasy of killing a woman during sex and feeling her vaginal contractions during the death spasms.

One night, in June 1980, Clark came home and told Bundy about two teenagers, Gina Marano and Cynthia Chandler, whom he had murdered after picking them up on the Sunset Strip. He had ordered them to perform fellatio on him and then shot them both in the head before taking them to a garage and raping their dead bodies. He had then dumped the bodies near the Ventura Freeway, where they were found the next day. An uneasy Bundy phoned the police, admitting to having some knowledge of the murders, but refused to provide any clues as to Clark's identity. Clark told Bundy that if either of them were apprehended, he would take the blame in the hope that she would be allowed to go free.

Twelve days after the initial murders, Clark killed two sex workers, Karen Jones, and Exxie Wilson. Like before, Clark lured them into the car, shot them, and dumped their bodies in plain sight, but not before removing Wilson's head. Clark took the head back home and stored it in the refrigerator. Bundy, upon seeing it, put make-up on it before Clark used it again for another "bout of necrophilia."

Two days later, the couple put the freshly cleaned head in a box and dumped it in an alleyway. Three days later, another victim was found in the woods in the San Fernando Valley. The victim was a runaway named Marnette Comer, who appeared to have been killed three weeks earlier, making her Clark's first known victim.

Meanwhile, Bundy attended country music performances by Jack Murray, her former apartment manager, and lover. After one such performance, Bundy conversed with Murray and drunkenly talked about what she and Clark were doing. Murray was alarmed and implied that he might tell the police. In August 1980, Bundy lured Murray into his van after a show to have sex to prevent this from happening. Once they were inside, she shot and decapitated him.

Bundy left various clues behind, including shell casings in the van. Two days later, Bundy bowed to psychological pressure and confessed to her co-workers that she had killed Murray. They called the police, and she gave a full confession to her and Clark's crimes.

Clark is believed to have murdered an unidentified youth who was discovered on August 26, 1980, in Newhall, California. The victim had been shot in the head and was found wearing only a red sweatshirt. Her face was reconstructed by the National Center for Missing and Exploited Children in efforts to identify her, as her remains were unrecognizable due to skeletonization.

Arrest and conviction 
After his arrest, the murder weapons were found hidden at Clark's workplace. Bundy was charged with two murders: Murray and the unknown victim whose killing she confessed to having been present at. Clark was charged with six murders. At his trial, he acted as his defense counsel and tried to blame Bundy for everything, claiming he had been manipulated. The jury did not believe him, and he was sentenced to death in 1983. , Clark was still on California's death row.

Bundy made a plea bargain and in return for her testimony was sentenced to fifty-two-years-to-life imprisonment. Bundy died in prison from heart failure on December 9, 2003, at the age of 61.

However, some doubt has been cast on the nature of Clark's conviction. Criminologist Christopher Berry-Dee has contended that Clark could provide alibis for five of the seven murders he was convicted of and that the presiding judge refused to accept key physical evidence, including a witness and several banking documents that exonerated Clark in Wilson's murder. Bundy's testimony was proven to be highly inconsistent; she claimed at first that Clark had murdered "Jane Doe 18" two weeks before her interview on August 11 without her involvement or knowledge. When she was told that Clark had an alibi for that date, she was allowed to change her story. Subsequently, she provided intricate details on the manner of the murder and the location of the body, even though she had initially claimed to know nothing about it.

Bundy also alleged that police allowed her to withdraw $3,000 from Murray's bank account, although she claimed the police took the money.

See also
List of serial killers in the United States
Lust murder
William Bonin

References

Further reading

External links

1948 births
1980 murders in the United States
20th-century American criminals
American male criminals
American murderers of children
American people convicted of murder
American prisoners sentenced to death
American rapists
American serial killers
Crimes against sex workers in the United States
Criminals from Pennsylvania
Criminals from Los Angeles
Living people
Male serial killers
Necrophiles
People convicted of murder by California
Prisoners sentenced to death by California